Arthur Henry "Cotton" Berndt (January 26, 1884 – c. 1951) was an American football, basketball, and baseball player and coach.  He was a multi-sport start at Indiana University Bloomington in the late 1900s, serving as captain of the football, basketball and baseball teams.  He was the head coach for the Indiana Hoosiers men's basketball team for the 1913–14 and 1914–15 seasons, compiling a record of 6–21. He remained employed by Indiana University in 1942.

References

External links
 Arthur Berndt at College Basketball at Sports-Reference.com

1884 births
Year of death missing
American football ends
American men's basketball players
Basketball coaches from Indiana
Basketball players from Indianapolis
DePauw Tigers football coaches
Indiana Hoosiers baseball coaches
Indiana Hoosiers baseball players
Indiana Hoosiers football players
Indiana Hoosiers men's basketball coaches
Indiana Hoosiers men's basketball players
Baseball players from Indianapolis
Players of American football from Indianapolis